South Asian cinema refers to the cinema of Afghanistan, Bangladesh, Bhutan, India, Maldives, Nepal, Pakistan and Sri Lanka. The broader terms Asian cinema, Eastern cinema and Oriental cinema in common usage often encompass South Asia as well as East Asia and South East Asia.

Styles and genres
The scope of South Asian cinema is huge and takes in a wide array of different film styles, linguistic regions, and genres. South Asian cinema is particularly famous in the West for:

 Melodramatic films
 Action films
 Curry Westerns
 Escapism
 Musicals
 Romance films
 Masala films
 Parallel cinema
 Drama films
 Thriller films
 Art films
 Indian neo-noir
 Neorealism
 Heroic bloodshed
 Historical drama

Regional industries

Bangladeshi cinema

 Bangladeshi film industry, is the Bengali language film industry based in Dhaka, Bangladesh. The industry often generally referred to as Dhallywood, has been a significant film industry since the early 1970s. The 1960s, 1970s, 1980s, and the first half of the 1990s were the golden years for Bangladeshi films as the industry produced many successful films. The industry has recently begun receiving international acclaim and many Bangladeshi films are getting released internationally.
 Dhallywood, is a portmanteau of the words Dhaka and Hollywood.

Indian cinema

India contains many state languages which have film industries centered on them.  Although Hindi is the official language of government business in northern regions of India, its often-used dialect Hindustani is the most widespread language but covers only 40% of the total population, and English is widely understood irrespective of region, the state languages are preserved for official use by different states in India, and many have as many speakers as an average European nation. Regional industries have also tended to produce a higher percentage of serious art films and political films. Bangladeshi cinema is filmed in Bengali and Sri Lankan cinema is filmed in Sinhala and Tamil. Last but not least is Indonesian cinema. In the beginning, Indonesian cinema grew after World War I, rooted in the Folk Theater Drama called Dardanela. Under Usmar Ismail, Indonesian cinema became the new entertainment from 1950 to 1980. Hundred of film stars were born, such as Citra Dewi (1960), and Tanty Yosepha (1970). Yenny Rachman and Christine Hakim (1980) and Dian Sastro (the late 1990s). Teguh Karya was one of the leading Film directors in Indonesia after the era of Usmar Ismail. Now, with the popularity of television, the film is replaced with electronic cinema which is popular as sinetron. This industry has made the Indian-born producer, Raam Punjabi, a tycoon of sinetron in Indonesia.
 Hindi Cinema, popularly known as Bollywood, is based in Mumbai. This film industry is the most prolific and popular in South Asia.
Telugu cinema, popularly known as Tollywood, which comes from the mixture of Hollywood and Telugu, based in Hyderabad, Telangana. It was formerly located in Chennai, Tamil Nadu.
 Tamil cinema- The Tamil film industry (also known as Kollywood) based in the Kodambakkam area of Chennai (formerly Madras).  
 Kannada cinema, based in Bangalore, Karnataka. The industry is known for churning out parallel and commercial movies with equal success. 
 Marathi cinema, based in Mumbai and Pune.
 Bhojpuri cinema, based in Bihar and Bhojpuri Language speaking regions of Bihar and Jharkhand.
 Bengali Cinema-long centered in the Tollygunge area of Kolkata (formerly Calcutta). This film industry is known for producing many internationally acclaimed films by directors such as Satyajit Ray, Budhhadeb Dasgupta, Mrinal Sen, and Ritwik Ghatak.
 Malayalam Cinema, Malayalam film industry, sometimes known as Mollywood, based in Kochi and Trivandrum in Kerala. Several of its directors such as Shaji N. Karun have also received international acclaim.
 Gujarati cinema, based in Gujarat.
Haryanvi cinema, Haryanvi language cinema, based in Haryana
 Chhollywood, the Chhattisgarhi language based film industry based in the state of Chhattisgarh.
 Dogri cinema, Dogri Language cinema of Jammu region.
Kashmiri cinema, Kashmiri Language cinema of Kashmir valley.
Cinema of Rajasthan, Based in Rajasthan
 Cinema of Odisha, the Odia language film industry based in Bhubaneshwar and Cuttack.
 Punjabi film industry, based in Punjab, India, popularly known as Pollywood
Manipuri film industry, based in Manipur and produces mostly Meitei language films. It is the biggest film industry of North East India.
 Assamese film industry, based in Assam.
Tulu cinema Tulu language-speaking regions of Karnataka viz. Tulu Nadu based in Mangalore.
Santali cinema Santali speaking regions on Jharkhand, West Bengal, Odisha & Assam

Nepali cinema

 Nepali film industry, the Nepali film industry based in Kathmandu, has recently begun receiving international acclaim with films such as The Black Hen (2015), Kagbeni (2006), Dying Candle (2016) and others.
 Tharu Cinema based in Terai, Tharuhat is the home of the Tharu languages cinema.

Pakistani cinema

 Balochi cinema, based in Quetta, Balochistan is the home of Balochi language film productions.
 Lollywood, based in Lahore, Punjab for Punjabi cinema and Karachi, Sindh, Pakistan for Urdu cinema. 
 Pashto cinema, based in Peshawar, Khyber Pakhtunkhwa is the home of Pashto language film productions.
 Sindhi cinema, based in Karachi, Sindh, Pakistan is the home of the Sindhi language film productions.

Others
 Sri Lankan cinema
 Sri Lankan Tamil cinema
 Bhutanese cinema

Some figures of South Asian cinema

Directors
 
 
 A. R. Murugadoss – Tamil director (Ghajini, Ghajini, Thuppakki, Kaththi, Sarkar, Darbar)
 Abu Shahed Emon
 Adoor Gopalakrishnan – Malayalam director (Elippathayam, Swayamvaram).
 Alamgir Kabir
 Amitabh Reza Chowdhury 
 Anurag Kashyap - (Gangs of Wasseypur, Black Friday)
 Aparna Sen – Indian Bengali actress and director (36 Chowringhee Lane, Mr. and Mrs. Iyer).
 Ashutosh Gowariker – Contemporary Hindi actor, director and producer (Lagaan).
 Asoka Handagama -  recognized as the pioneer of Sri Lankan cinema's ‘ third revolution’
 Balu Mahendra – Sri Lanka-born Tamil and Malayalam director (Sandhya Raagam, Veedu).
 Basu Chatterjee – (Chitchor).
 Bharathiraja – Tamil director who captured village life (Muthal Mariyathai, Vedham Pudhithu).
 Bimal Roy – Hindi film director (Devdas, Do Bigha Zameen).
 Boyapati Srinu
 Budhhadeb Dasgupta – Uttara, internationally acclaimed filmmaker known for surrealism and magical realism. 
 Chashi Nazrul Islam
 Dasari Narayana Rao
 Deepa Mehta – Indian-born Canadian director best known for her "elements trilogy". Fire, Earth, Water).
 Dharmasena Pathiraja - Widely recognized as the pioneer of Sri Lankan cinema's ‘second revolution’
 Ehtesham
 EVV Satyanarayana
 Fateh Lohani
 Girish Karnad – (Anand Bhairavi).
 Govind Nihalani – Cinematographer and director.
 Gurinder Chadha – British director (Bend It Like Beckham, Bride and Prejudice).
 Guru Dutt – Hindi actor, director and producer of the 1950s and '60s (Mr. & Mrs. '55, Kaagaz Ke Phool, Pyaasa).
 Hrishikesh Mukherjee – Hindi film director known for (Anand, Abhimaan).
 Humayun Ahmed – One of the most successful writers and directors of Bangladesh.
 K. Asif – Mughal-e-Azam
 K. Balachander – Tamil director.
 K. Raghavendra Rao
 K. S. Ravikumar – Tamil film director (Muthu, Padayappa, Dasavathaaram)
 K. Viswanath – Telugu director known for films like Sankarabharanam, Swathi Muthyam, Swayam Krushi.
 Kamal Amrohi – Mahal Pakeeza Razia Sultan
 Kamar Ahmed Saimon
 Ketan Mehta – (Bhavni Bhavai, Maya Memsaab).
 Khan Ataur Rahman
 Krishna Vamsi
 Lester James Peries - Considered as the father of Sri Lankan cinema
 Madhur Bhandarkar – Director and screenwriter (Page 3, Chandni Bar).
 Malaka Dewapriya - is a contemporary  young Sri Lankan filmmaker
 Mahboob
 Mani Ratnam – Generally works in Tamil films but has worked in Hindi, Malayalam, Telugu and Kannada industries. (Kannathil Muthamittal, Guru).
 Mani Shankar – Director of Bollywood action thrillers (16 December, Tango Charlie)
 Manmohan Desai – (Parvarish, Amar Akbar Anthony).
 Mira Nair – (Monsoon Wedding, Salaam Bombay!).
 Morshedul Islam
 Mostofa Sarwar Farooki
 Mrinal Sen – Bengali film director, has won awards at major film festivals (Baishey Shravan, Bhuvan Shome).
 Nagathihalli Chandrashekhar – (America! America!!, Amruthadhaare).
 Narayan Ghosh Mita
 Nasir Hussain – (Qayamat Se Qayamat Tak)
 Nischal Basnet – (Loot, Loot 2)
 Partho Sen-Gupta – Avant-garde independent director (Hava Aney Dey).
 Prakash Jha – Contemporary Hindi director (Gangaajal, Apaharan).
 Prakash Mehra – (Zanjeer, Hera Pheri).
 Prashanta Nanda – Oriya film director who won most of the National Awards for his contribution for Oriya Film Industry.
 Prashanta Nanda - recognized as the pioneer of  realistict cinema at third generation in the Sri Lankan cinema.’
 Puri Jagannadh
 Puttanna Kanagal – (Belli moda).
 Rajkumar Santoshi – (Ghayal, Andaz Apna Apna).
 Rakesh Roshan – (Karan Arjun, Krrish).
 Rakeysh Omprakash Mehra – Director and screenwriter (Aks, Rang De Basanti).
 Ram Gopal Varma –  (Shiva, Rangeela).
 Ramesh Sippy – (Sholay, Andaz)
 Ritwik Ghatak – Bengali film director, (Nagarik, Meghe Dhaka Tara).
 S. S. Rajamouli – Telugu  film director, (Baahubali: The Beginning, Baahubali 2: The Conclusion,  RRR).
 S. Shankar –  Tamil director and producer (Gentleman, Indian, Mudhalvan, Anniyan, Sivaji: The Boss, Enthiran, I, 2.0)
 Saawan Kumar
 Sanjay Gupta – (Zinda)
 Sanjay Leela Bhansali – (Devdas, Black)
 Santosh Sivan – Award-winning cinematographer and director (The Terrorist, Asoka).
 Satyajit Ray – Bengali film director, widely regarded as one of the greatest auteurs of 20th century cinema (Apu trilogy).
 Shekhar Kapur – British India-born director and producer (Elizabeth, Bandit Queen).
 Shyam Benegal – Important part of the New India Cinema movement (Ankur, Bhumika).
 Sonali Gulati – contemporary independent filmmaker, activist, and feminist who has made award-winning documentary and experimental films.
 Subhash Dutta
 Sudhir Mishra – Contemporary director and screenwriter (Hazaaron Khwaishein Aisi, Chameli).
 Sukumar
 S.V. Krishna Reddy
 Tanvir Mokammel
 Tareque Masud
 Trivikram
 Tulsi Ghimire – Nepali movie director (Known for Kusume Rumal, Lahure, Darpan Chaya)
 Upendra – (A, Om).
 V. Shantaram – Hindi director and actor (Do Aankhen Barah Haath).
 Vidhu Vinod Chopra – (An Encounter with Faces, 1942: A Love Story).
 Vijay Anand – Bollywood actor, director, and producer mainly during the 1960s and '70s. (Johnny Mera Naam, Jewel Thief)
 Vikram Bhatt – (Inteha, Deewane Huye Pagal).
 Yash Chopra – Veteran producer and director (Waqt, Deewaar).
 Yograj Bhat – (Mungaru Male).
 Zahir Raihan
 Tulsi Ghimire – Nepali movie director (Known for Kusume Rumal, Lahure, Darpan Chaya)

Actors
 
 

 Aamir Khan
 Aaryan Sigdel
 Abdur Razzak 
 Abhishek Bachchan
 Ajay Devgan
 Ajith Kumar
 Aravind Swamy
 Akkineni Nageswara Rao
 Akshay Kumar
 Alamgir 
 Allu Arjun
 Ambareesh
 Amitabh Bachchan
 Amrish Puri
 Anant Nag
 Ananta Jalil 
 Anil Chatterjee
 Anil Kapoor
 Anmol K.C.
 Anubhav Mohanty
 Anwar Hossain
 Arifin Shuvoo
 Arjun Sarja
 Arpan Thapa
 Arshad Warsi
 Ashok Kumar
 ATM Shamsuzzaman 
 Balraj Sahni
 Bappy Chowdhury
 Bhuwan K.C.
 Bipin Karki
 Biraj Bhatta
 Bulbul Ahmed
 Chandra Mohan
 Chhabi Biswas
 Chiranjeet
 Chiranjeevi
 Chunky Pandey
 Daggubati Venkatesh
 Deepak Adhikari Dev
 Dev Anand
 Dhanush
 Dharmendra
 Dilip Kumar
 Dipjol 
 Dulquer Salmaan
 Fahadh Faasil
 Faisal Rehman
 Ferdous Ahmed
 Feroz Khan
 Hamza Ali Abbasi
 Hrithik Roshan
 Humayun Faridi 
 Humayun Saeed
 Ilias Kanchan 
 Jackie Shroff
 Jagathi Sreekumar
 Jagapathi Babu
 Jayam Ravi
 Jayan
 Jayaram
 Jeet (actor)
 Jeetendra
 Kamal Haasan
 Kazi Maruf
 Kishore Kumar
 Krishna
 M.G. Ramachandran
 Mahesh Babu
 Mammooty
 Mamnun Hasan Emon
 Manna 
 Manoj Bajpai
 Manoj Kumar
 Mehmood
 Mithun Chakraborty
 Moammar Rana
 Mohammad Ali
 Mohan Babu
 Mohanlal
 Mohib Mirza
 Mukesh
 Nandamuri Balakrishna
 N. T. Rama Rao Jr.
 N. T. Rama Rao
 Nadeem
 Naga Chaitanya
 Nagarjuna
 Nana Patekar
 Nani
 Naseeruddin Shah
 Nikhil Upreti
 Nithin
 Nivin Pauly
 Om Puri
 Omar Sani
 Pahari Sanyal
 Pawan Kalyan
 Prabhas
 Prabhu Deva
 Pran
 Prithviraj Sukumaran
 Prosenjit Chatterjee 
 Puneeth Rajkumar
 Madavan
 Raaj Kumar
 Rabi Ghosh
 Rahsaan Islam 
 Raisul Islam Asad 
 Raj Kapoor
 Rajendra Prasad
 Rajesh Hamal
 Rajesh Khanna
 Rajinikanth
 Rajkumar
 Ram
 Ram Charan
 Ramesh Aravind
 Ranjit Mallick
 Ravi Teja
 Riaz 
 Rishi Kapoor
 Ritesh Deshmukh
 Saif Ali Khan
 Salman Khan
 Salman Shah 
 Sanjay Dutt
 Sanjeev Kumar
 Saugat Malla
 Shaan
 Shahrukh Khan
 Shakib Khan
 Shammi Kapoor
 Shamoon Abbasi
 Shankar Nag
 Siddhanta Mahapatra
 Siddharth (actor)
 Sivaji Ganeshan
 Sobhan Babu
 Sohel Rana (actor) 
 Soumitra Chatterjee 
 Srikanth
 Subhash Dutta
 Sunil
 Sunil Dutt
 Sunny Deol
 Suresh Gopi
 Surya Sivakumar
 Sushant Singh Rajput
 Symon Sadik
 Tapas Paul
 Tapen Chatterjee
 Thilakan
 Tulsi Chakraborty
 Upendra
 Uttam Kumar
 Uttam Mohanty
 Vidyut Jamwal
 Vijay
 Vijay Devarakonda
 Vijay Sethupathi
 Vikram
 Vinod Khanna
 Vinod Mehra
 Vishnuvardhan
 Vivek Oberoi
 Waheed Murad
 Wasim
 Zafar Iqbal

Actresses
 
 

 Achol
 Aishwarya Rai - Miss World 1994
 Aishwarya Rajesh
 Akshara Haasan
 Alia Bhatt
 Alisha Pradhan
 Amala Paul
 Amrita Acharia - (Game of Thrones)
 Amrita Rao
 Andrea Jeremiah
 Anjali (film actress)
 Anju Ghosh
 Anu Emmanuel
 Anushka Sharma
 Anushka Shetty
 Aparajita Mohanty
 Apu Biswas
 Archita Sahu
 Asin Thottumkal
 Ayesha Takia
 B. Saroja Devi
 Barsha Priyadarshini
 Bidya Sinha Saha Mim
 Bipasha Basu
 Bhavana Menon
 Bobby
 Bobita (Dhallywood Actress)
 Catherine Tresa
 Celina Jaitly - Miss India 2001
 Debashree Roy
 Deepika Padukone 
 Devika Rani
 Dia Mirza - Miss Asia Pacific 2000
 Diana Hayden - Miss World 1997 
 Dimple Kapadia
 Divya Spandana (Ramya)
 Esha Gupta
 Genelia
 Hansika Motwani
 Hema Malini
 Ileana D'Cruz
 Jaya Bachchan
 Jaya Prada
 Jayasudha
 Jayanthi
 Juhi Chawla - Miss India 1984
 Kajal Aggarwal
 Kajol
 Kangana Ranaut
 Kareena Kapoor
 Karishma Kapoor
 Karishma Manandhar
 Katrina Kaif
 Keerthy Suresh
 Keki Adhikari
 Kiara Advani
 Koel Mallick
 Lakshmi Menon
 Lakshmi Rai
 Lara Dutta - Miss Universe 2000
 Madhubala
 Madhuri Dixit
 Mahiya Mahi 
 Manisha Koirala
 Manju Warrier
 Meena
 Meena Kumari
 Meera Jasmine
 Moushumi
 Nandita Das
 Nargis
 Nayanthara
 Neha Dhupia - Miss India 2002
 Nicole Faria - Miss Earth 2010
 Nikki Galrani
 Nisha Adhikari
 Nithya Menon
 Noor Jehan
 Nutan
 Padmini
 Parvatii Nair
 Parvathy Thiruvothu
 Pooja Hegde
 Popy
 Preity Zinta
 Prema
 Priyamani
 Priyanka Chopra - Miss World 2000
 Priyanka Karki - Miss Teen
 Purnima
 Rachana Banerjee
 Rakul Preet Singh
 Ramya Krishna
 Rani Mukerji
 Rashmika Mandanna
 Regina Cassandra
 Rekha Thapa
 Rekha
 Richa Gangopadhyay
 Ritika Singh
 Ritu Varma
 Rituparna Sengupta
 Samantha Ruth Prabhu
 Sanjjanaa
 Savitri
 Sayyeshaa
 Shabana Azmi
 Shabana (Dhallywood actress)
 Shabnur
 Sharmila Tagore
 Shobana
 Shraddha Kapoor
 Shriya Saran
 Shruti Haasan
 Smita Patil
 Soha Ali Khan
 Sonali Bendre
 Soundarya
 Sri Divya
 Sridevi
 Srividya
 Suchitra Sen
 Sushmita Sen - Miss Universe 1994
 Swastima Khadka
 Tabu
 Tamannaah
 Taapsee Pannu
 Trisha Krishnan
 Urmila Matondkar
 Urvashi
 Vidya Balan
 Vyjayanthimala
 Yukta Mookhey - Miss World 1999
 Zeenat Aman - Miss Asia Pacific 1970

See also
 Cinema of the world
 Alpavirama South Asian Short Film Festival (Alpavirama)
 Asian cinema
 World cinema
 Sambalpuri Cinema
 List of Hollywood-inspired nicknames
 East Asian cinema
 Southeast Asian cinema

Further reading
 Contemporary Asian Cinema, Anne Tereska Ciecko, editor. Berg, 2006.

References

Asian cinema
Asian cinema by region